Missing Daughters may refer to:
 Missing Daughters (1939 film), an American crime film
 Missing Daughters (1924 film), an American silent crime drama film